Dangorayo is a town in the northeastern Nugal region of Somalia. It is the capital of the Dangorayo District. Dangorayo along with Waiye were nominated as districts in 1990 under a degree issued by the former president Mohamed Siad Barre which made Dangorayo official and the last nominated district. Waiye didn’t undergo the whole process therefore its status as district remained pending.

Demographics
The broader Dangorayo District has a total population of 20,331 residents.

Education
Dangorayo has a number of academic institutions. According to the Puntland Ministry of Education, there are 13 primary schools in the Dangorayo District. Among these are Kalyaxed, Hanad, Qundhed and Garmal. Secondary schools in the area include Taageer.

Economy
In March 2015, the Ministry of Labour, Youth and Sports in conjunction with the European Union and World Vision launched the Nugal Empowerment for Better Livelihood Project in the Dangorayo, Garowe, Eyl, Godobjiran and Burtinle districts of Puntland. The three-year initiative is valued at $3 million EUR, and is part of the New Deal Compact for Somalia. It aims buttress the regional economic sector through business support, training and non-formal education programs, community awareness workshops, and mentoring and networking drives.

Notes

References
Dan Gorayo

Populated places in Nugal, Somalia